William Spencer (sometimes shown as William Spenser) was an early Virginia colonist on Jamestown Island, who was an Ancient planter and a member of the Virginia House of Burgesses in Jamestown, Virginia for Mulberry Island in 1632/33.

William Spence Distinguished 

William Spencer is sometimes erroneously conflated with William Spence (burgess), another early Virginia colonist who also lived on Jamestown Island. William Spence came to Virginia in the First Supply mission to Jamestown in 1608. Spence was member of the first assembly of the Virginia House of Burgesses in 1619. Spence is sometimes identified as Ensign William Spence or Ensign Spence. He, his wife and his young daughter, Sara, or Sarah, avoided the Indian massacre of 1622, but Spence and his wife were reported "lost" at the census of February 16, 1624. Their daughter was placed with a guardian by the General Court at Jamestown by early 1625.

William Spencer later became a member of the House of Burgesses for Mulberry Island for the 1632-33 and 1633 session, eight years after William Spence was lost and presumed dead.

Arrival at Jamestown 

Martha McCartney states, with citations, that Spencer arrived in the "Sarah or Susan Constant." The phrase "Sarah" or "Susan", as stated by McCartney does not require the interpretation that it refers to the Susan Constant since a ship named the Sara(h) arrived at Jamestown in August 1611 with the returning Sir Thomas Gates (governor). Spencer's arrival on the Sarah is consistent with references to Spencer arriving in Jamestown in 1611 on the Sarah, the absence of his name from the Susan Constant passenger list or the list of first settlers and McCartney's further sketch. The Virtual Jamestowne site also shows that William Spencer arrived on the Sarah as shown in the Muster Roll of 1624/5.

Property; Family 

Because of his early arrival at Jamestown and continued residence there, Spencer was considered an "Ancient planter", which was simply a descriptive term for early Virginia colonists who arrived when the colony was managed by the Virginia Company of London. They received land grants if they stayed in the colony for at least three years. Under the terms of the "Instructions to Governor Yeardley" issued by the London Company in 1618, these colonists received the first land grants in Virginia.

On August 14, 1624, William Spencer of James City, "Yeoman and Ancient Planter" secured a patent for 12 acres of land in James City described as "a narrow ridge towards Goose Hill." Goose Hill was described in a footnote as "at the lower end of Jamestown Island." 

At the date of the Muster Roll of January 24, 1625 (census), Spencer was reported as residing on his property on Jamestown Island with his wife Alice and their daughter, also named Alice, who was 4 years old. 

William and Alice had a young son who died some time between February 1624 and the muster of January 24, 1625 (new style calendar). They had two daughters who lived to adulthood. Anne Spencer married William Cockeram and Elizabeth Spencer married in turn Robert Sheppard, Thomas Warren and John Hunnicut.

According to McCartney, from 1620 to at least 1626 Spencer was the overseer of property in the "Governor's Land" owned by Captain William Peirce (burgess), later a member of the House of Burgesses for Jamestown in 1624 and a member of the Council of State from 1632 to 1643. He also became the overseer of John Rolfe's plantation and servants on the lower side of the James River after Rolfe died in 1622. Rolfe's, Peirce's and Spencer's servants lived on Rolfe's land after Rolfe's death.

In 1629, Spencer inherited the property of his neighbor, John Lightfoot. Also in 1629, Spencer used the headright of his wife Dorothy, who arrived on the Neptune in 1619, to patent 290 acres of land. McCartney states it is not clear whether Dorothy was Spencer's wife before or after Alice.

Spencer patented 1,350 acres of land next to Lawne's Creek in the early 1630s.

A 1635 deed of 550 acres in Surry County, Virginia to William Spencer indicated he was a justice of the county.

Burgess 

William Spencer was a member of the House of Burgesses in 1632/33 and later session in 1633 for Mulberry Island. McCartney notes that William Peirce also had an investment in property on Mulberry Island.

Later life; Death 

McCartney states that Spencer was a tobacco viewer for the territory between Lawnes Creek and Hog Island in 1640, but land records indicate that Spencer died in 1638. McCartney also states that Spencer conducted business for Captain William Peirce as late as 1655 but also states that Peirce died before June 22, 1647

More certain sources, land transfer records, show that Spencer died on February 10, 1637 (1638 new style).

Footnotes

Citations

References

  Ancient Planters web site. Retrieved July 11, 2020.
 Grizzard, Frank E. and Dennis Boyd Smith. Jamestown Colony: A Political, Social and Cultural History. Santa Barbara, CA: ABC-CLIO, 2007. .
 Holtzclaw, B. C.  The Newsom Family: And Related Families of Surry, Isle of Wight, Southampton and Sussex Counties, Va. The Virginia Magazine of History and Biography, Volume 47  No. 4. Richmond, VA: Virginia Historical Society, October 1939. p. 386. Retrieved August 9, 2020. via JSTOR.org.
 Kolb, Avery E.  Early Passengers to Virginia: When Did They Really Arrive?, The Virginia Magazine of History and Biography, Vol. 88, No. 4. Oct. 1980. via JSTOR.org.
 McCartney, Martha W.  Virginia immigrants and adventurers, 1607-1635: a biographical dictionary. Baltimore: Genealogical Pub. Co., 2007. .
 McIlwaine, H. R. Journals of the House of Burgesses of Virginia, 1619-1658/59. Richmond, VA: The Colonial Press, E. Waddey Co. 1915. .
  "Minutes of the Council and General Court, 1622-1624." The Virginia Magazine of History and Biography, Volume 19, No. 2, 1911: p. 129. via JSTOR.org. Editor not shown in article.
 Price, David A. Love & Hate in Jamestown: John Smith, Pocahontas and the Start of a New Nation. New York: Vintage Books, a Division of Random House, Inc., 2003. .
 Robinson, Gregory, and Robin R. Goodison. "Sarah versus Susan." The William and Mary Quarterly 16, No. 4, 1936. pages 515-21.
 Stanard, W. G. Abstracts of Virginia Land Patents, The Virginia Magazine of History and Biography, Volume I, No. 1. Richmond, VA: House of the Society, William Ellis Jones,  Printer, July 1893. p. 89.
 Stanard, William G. and Mary Newton Stanard. The Virginia Colonial Register. Albany, NY: Joel Munsell's Sons Publishers, 1902. , Retrieved July 15, 2011.
 Tyler, Lyon Gardiner in Encyclopedia of Virginia biography. New York: Lewis Historical Pub. Co., 1915. . Retrieved July 21, 2011. 
 United States National Park Service. The First Residents of Jamestowne. National Park Service Historic Jamestowne page. Retrieved July 11, 2020.
  Muster Search result for William Spencer. Virtual Jamestowne web site. Retrieved August 9, 2020.
 Woolley, Benjamin. Savage Kingdom: The True Story of Jamestown, 1607, and the Settlement of America. New York: Harper Perennial, 2008. Originally published as Savage Kingdom: Virginia and the Founding of English America in the United Kingdom by HarperCollins Publishers, 2007. 

Year of birth unknown
Year of death unknown
House of Burgesses members
American people of English descent
Virginia colonial people
English emigrants
People from Jamestown, Virginia
People from Charles City County, Virginia
American planters